is a tokusatsu television series made by Ishinomori Productions and Toei. The series consisted of 34 episodes and was produced with Nippon Television. It aired in Japan from January 10, 1985 until August 29, 1985.

Songs
Opening theme

Lyrics: 
Composition: 
Arrangement: 
Artist: 

Ending theme

Lyrics: 
Composition: 
Arrangement: 
Artist: 

Insert songs

Lyrics: 
Composition: 
Arrangement: 
Artist: 

Lyrics: 
Composition: 
Arrangement: 
Artist: 

Shotaro Ishinomori
Toei tokusatsu
1985 Japanese television series debuts
1985 Japanese television series endings
Nippon TV original programming